Total of 245 species either found or highly expected to be found in New York.

Subfamily ERISTALINAE

Tribe Brachyopini
This tribe contains 8 genera and 31 or likely more species found in New York State

Genus Brachyopa

Genus Chrysogaster
 Chrysogaster antitheus (Walker, 1849)  The Short-haired Wrinklehead is a fairly common species.

Genus Chrysosyrphus
 Chrysosyrphus latus ( (Loew, 1863) The Variable Wrinklehead is a rare species

Genus Hammerschmidtia
Hammerschmidtia is a Holarctic Genus of hoverflies. The larvae are found in sap under the bark of downed trees.
They appear quite unlike other syrphids, having drab colors and numerous bristles but on closer inspection they do have the general indicators of syrphids in a spurious vein.
 Hammerschmidtia rufa, The Black-bristled Logsitter is an uncommon species.
 Hammerschmidtia sedmani Pale-bristled Logsitter is a rare species in N.Y.

Genus Myolepta
Three species of Myolepta occur in New York. Keys and descriptions of this species was made by Fluke and Weems in 1956. Larvae are described by Rotheray  

 Myolepta strigilata
 M. nigra
 M. varipes

Genus Neoascia
Neoascia (Williston, 1886) Fen Flies
These are very small (3.5–5 mm) black and yellow or metallic green flies with a narrow abdomen near the thorax. They occur mainly in damp places around plants. . Neoascia larvae have been recovered from wet manure in farmyards, and decaying vegetation at the edges of ponds. In 1925 Curran reviewed the Genus Neoascia

 Neoascia metallica (Williston, 1882 ) The Double-banded Fen Fly, is a common species.
 Neoascia tenur (Harris, 1780)  The Black-kneed Fen Fly is a common species that was formerly considered to be only European now considered to be throughout North America and Canada.
 Neoascia globosa (Walker, 1849) The Black-margined Fen Fly is a fairly common species.

Genus Orthonevra

Four species Orthonevra (Macquart, 1829) of these small dark metallic flies are found in New York. Sedman divided this genus into two groups, the pictipennis group  of which N.Y. has O. pictipennis, O. Weemsi and O. pulchella and the Bellula group  with O. nitida being found in N.Y. This genus is one of the few where the eyes are ornamented with either horizontal medial lines or meandering lines across the eye. Keys and descriptions have been provided by Sedman.
 Orthonevra nitida (Wiedemann, 1830) The Wavy mucksucker is a fairly common species.

 Orthonevra pictipennis (Loew, 1863)  Dusky-veined Mucksucker is an uncommon species.
 Orthonevra pulchella (Williston, 1887)  The Dusky Mucksucker is a fairly common species.
 Orthonevra weemsi (Sedman, 1966)  Weems' Mucksucker is a rare species.

Genus Sphegina

These are distinctive small flies with a thin elongate abdomen and enlarged hind femur often with spines and or teeth. The larvae are found under bark in water soaked areas. Rotheray has described European species and habitats as well as a key to larvae including sphegina and other syrphid genera. Keys to adult American species was provided by Coovert. New York species can also be found southward especially in the Appalachian Mountains and also north to the New England States.
There are various keys online, Covert 1977 Hull, 1935  and Malloch, 1922 

 :{|class="wikitable"
|-! name !! authority !! common name!!prevalence
|+ Sphegina (Meigen, 1822)
|-
|Sphegina brachygaster || Hull, 1935 || Thick-waisted Pufftail || fairly common
|-
| Sphegina campanulata || Robertson, 1901 ||Orange-horned Pufftail || fairly common
|-
|Sphegina flavimana || John Russell Malloch,1922  || Tuberculate Pufftail || fairly common
|-
|Sphegina flavomaculata|| John Russell Malloch,1922  || Tooth-legged Pufftail|| uncommon
|-
|Sphegina keeniana|| Williston,1887  || Peg-legged pufftail || fairly common
|-
|Sphegina lobata || Loew, 1863  ||Yellow-lobed Pufftail || uncommon
|-
|Sphegina lobulifera || John Russell Malloch,1922  || Black-lobed Pufftail || uncommon
|-
|Sphegina petiolata|| Coquillett, 1910 || Long-spined Pufftail || uncommon
|-
|Sphegina rufiventris|| Loew, 1910  || Black-horned pufftail || common
|-
|}

Tribe Callicerini

Genus Callicera
Only one species of this tribe is found in New york in the genus Callicera (Panzer, 1809).

 Callicera erratica (Walker, 1849)  The Golden Pine Fly is a rare species.

Tribe Cerioidini

Genus Ceriana
Ceriana(Rafinesque, 1815) has but one species in New York.
 Ceriana abbreviata (Loew, 1864)  The Northern Wasp Fly

Genus Sphiximorpha
Sphiximorpha (Rondani, 1850) is represented by a single rare species in New York.
 Sphiximorpha willistoni (Kahl, 1897)  Williston's Wasp Fly is a rare species.

Tribe Eristalini

Subtribe Eristalina

Genus Eristalinus

 Eristalinus aeneus (Scopoli, 1763) The Common Lagoon Fly is fairly common.

Genus Eristalis

New York has an prevalence of Eristalids many of which are striking in color and exhibit mimicry to the bees. The larvae are of the rat-tailed type. Eristalis along with many sister species has the r4+5 vein making a distinct loop towards the rear of the wing.

Species list

Genus Palpada

 Palpada albifrons (Weidemann 1830)  The White-faced Plushback is a rare vagrant
 Palpada vinetorum  (Fabricius 1799) The Northern Plushback is a fairly common species

Subtribe Helophilina

Genus Eurimyia
 Eurimyia stipata the Long-nosed Swamp Fly.

Genus Helophilus

Genus Anasimyia

Genus Polydontomyia
 Polydontomyia curvipes (Weidemann,1830)  The Dimorphic Sickleleg is locally common along salt marshes.

Genus Mallota
Large flies that strongly resemble bumblebees.
The larvae of, M. cimhiciformis (Fallen) and
M. posticata (Fabricius) develop in detritus-containing rot pockets, usually
wet tree holes in upright deciduous trees.

 Mallota cimbiciformis, (Fallén, 1816) 
 Mallota bautias Walker 1849  The Bare-eyed Mimic is a common species
 Mallota posticata,Fabricius 1805, The Hairy-eyed Mimic is a common species.

Genus Parhelophilus

Tribe Sericomyiini
This tribe has only one genus

Genus Sericomyia 

 Sericomyia chrysotoxoides (Macquart 1842)  The Oblique-banded Pond Fly is a common species.
 Sericomyia lata (Coquillett 1907)  The White-spotted Pond Fly is a common species.
 Sericomyia militaria (Walker, 1849)  The Narrow-banded Pond Fly is a common species.
 Sericomyia transversa (Osburn, 1926) The Yellow-spotted Pond Fly is an uncommon species.

Tribe Eumerini

Genus Eumerus 
 Eumerus funeralis (Meigen, 1822)  Lesser Bulb Fly is a fairly common species.
 Eumerus strigatus (Fallén, 1817)  Onion Bulb Fly is a fairly common species.

Genus Merodon 
 Merodon equestris (Fabricius, 1794) The Narcissus Bulb Fly is a fairly common species.

Tribe Milesiini 
This tribe contains 17 genera with 56 species found in New York

Genus Blera

Genus Brachypalpus 
 Brachypalpus oarus (Walker, 1849)  The Eastern Catkin Fly is a fairly common species.

Genus Chalcosyrphus

Genus Criorhina 
 Criorhina verbosa (Walker, 1849)  The Hairy-cheeked Bumble Fly is an uncommon species.
 Criorhina nigriventris (Walton, 1911)  The Bare-cheeked Bumble Fly is an uncommon species.

Genus Cynorhinella 
Cynorhinella (Curran, 1922) is a rare genus in New York with a single species.
 Cynorhinella longinasus (Shannon, 1924)  The Eastern Longnose Fly is a rare species.

Genus Hadromyia 
Hadromyia (Williston, 1882) a single species in New York 
 Hadromyia aepalius (Walker, 1849)  Sterling Quicksilver Fly is a rare species.

Genus Lejota 
Lejota (Róndani, 1857) has two uncommon species in New York.
 Lejota aerea (Loew 1872)  The Golden Trunksitter is an uncommon species
 Lejota cyanea (Smith 1912)  The Cobalt Trunksitter is an uncommon species.

Genus Milesia 
Milesia (Latreille, 1804) represented by a single, vivid species.
 Milesia virginiensis (Drury, 1773) The Virginia Giant is an uncommon species.

Genus Pterallastes 
Pterallastes (Loew, 1863)
 Pterallastes thoracicus (Loew 1863)  The Goldenback Fly is an uncommon species.

Genus Somula 
Somula (Macquart, 1847) has only two species worldwide, with one in New York.
 Somula decora (Macquart, 1847) The Spotted Wood Fly is an uncommon species.

Genus Sphecomyia 
Sphecomyia Latreille, 1829 is a genus of wasp mimics with one species found in New York.
 Sphecomyia vittata (Wiedemann, 1830)  The Long-horned Yellowjacket is an uncommon species.

Genus Spilomyia 
Many species in Spilomyia are wasp mimics with black and yellow patterns and using the black front legs to imitate the wasp antennae.
 The eyes on Spilomyia species are a distinctive characteristic which usually display vertical, and irregular stripes or blotches.
 Spilomyia alcimus (Walker 1849)  Broad-banded Hornet Fly is an uncommon species.
 Spilomyia fusca (Loew 1864)  Bald-faced Hornet Fly is a fairly common species.
 Spilomyia longicornis (Loew 1872)  Eastern Hornet Fly is an uncommon species
 Spilomyia sayi (Goot, 1964) Four-lined Hornet Fly is a fairly common species.

Genus Syritta 

 Syritta pipiens (Linnaeus, 1758 ) The Common Compost Fly is a very common species.

Genus Temnostoma

Genus Teuchocnemis 
Teuchocnemis (Osten-Sacken, 1876) species are more commonly found south of New York.
 Teuchocnemis bacuntius (Walker, 1849)  The Orange Spur Fly is a rare species.
 Teuchocnemis lituratus (Loew, 1863)  The Black Spur Fly is an uncommon species.

Genus Tropidia 

 Tropidia albistylum (Macquart, 1847)  The Yellow-thighed Thickleg Fly is a rare species
 Tropidia calcarata (Williston, 1887)  The Lily-loving Thickleg Fly is a rare species.
 Tropidia quadrata (Say, 1824) The Common Thickleg Fly is a common species.

Genus Xylota

Tribe Rhingiini

This tribe contains 5 genera and 8 species found in New York State

Genus Cheilosia 
This is a very large genus of little black flies with larvae feeding on plants or fungi.

Species observed in New York
 Cheilosia latrans 
 Cheilosia orilliaensis 
 Cheilosia pallipes 
 Cheilosia prima 

 Species observed next to New York
 Cheilosia albitarsis
 Cheilosia caltha 
 Cheilosia capillata 
 Cheilosia rita
 Cheilosia shannoni

Genus Ferdinandea
Ferdinandea (Róndani, 1844) has a single species in New York with a second species, Ferdinandea croesus, reported but the identity is not confirmed.
 Ferdinandea buccata (Loew, 1863)  The Common Copperback a fairly common species.

Genus Hiatomyia
 Hiatomyia cyanescens (Hunter, 1896) no page The Azure Deltawing an uncommon species.

Genus Pelecocera
Pelecocera (Meigen, 1822)  only reported from Long Island but may be more common as the small size and habit of staying in low lying flowers may make this fly under-reported.
 Pelecocera pergandei.(Williston, 1884) The Eastern Bighorn Fly is a very rare species.

Genus Rhingia
Rhingia(Scopoli, 1763) has only one species in North America.
 Rhingia nasica (Say, 1823) The American Snout Fly is a common species.

Tribe Volucellini

Genus Copestylum 
Copestylum (Macquart, 1846) due to the larval habit of living in Bromeliads only one species is found in New York.
 Copestylum vittatum Tropical Plushback The Striped Bromeliad Fly is an uncommon species.

Genus Volucella 
Volucella (Geoffroy, 1762) has two species that represent some of the best bumblebee mimics in New York.
The larvae of most species live in nests of bumblebees and social wasps, where they are detritivores and larval predators.
 Volucella evecta (Walker, 1852) The Eastern Swiftwing is an uncommon species.
 Volucella facialis (Linnaeus, 1758) The Yellow-faced Swiftwing is a fairly common species.

Subfamily PIPIZINAE 
This is the newest subfamily and the smallest in New York. The adult fly looks very much like the flies in Eristalinae while the larvae are predators much like the subfamily Syrphinae. The DNA evidence has been evaluated and concluded that Pipizinae are a sister subfamily to these subfamilies.

Genus Heringia 
 Heringia calcarata (Loew, 1866)  Opaque Spikeleg Fly
 Heringia canadensis, Curran, 1921, The Canadian Smoothleg Fly is a fairly common species
 Heringia salax, Loew, 1866  The Eastern Smoothleg Fly is a fairly common species
 Heringia coxalis (Curran, 1921) White-faced Spikeleg Fly
 Heringia elongata (Curran, 1921) Elongate Spikeleg Fly
 Heringia rita (Curran, 1921) Black-faced Spikeleg Fly

Genus Pipiza 
Pipiza (Fallén, 1810) is a genus of small nearly all black flies sometimes with yellow abdominal spots. The larvae, when known, feed upon gall making or leaf rolling aphids. Pipizini. The larvae of Pipiza species (fig. 257) seem to prefer aphids which secrete a waxy flocculence, e.g. woolly aphid (Eriosoma). Pipizella larvae confine their attention to subterranean aphids feeding on the roots of plants.
 Pipiza femoralis (Loew, 1866) The White-haired Pithead Fly
 Pipiza macrofemoralis (Curran, 1921) The Large-legged Pithead Fly is an uncommon species in New York
 Pipiza nigripilosa (Williston, 1887) The Pale-haired Pithead Fly is a common species.
 Pipiza puella (Williston, 1887) The Sumac Gall Pithead Fly is a common species.
 Pipiza quadrimaculata (Panzer, 1804) The Four-spotted Pithead Fly is a fairly common species.

Genus Trichopsomyia 
Trichopsomyia (Williston, 1888) is another genus of small black flies that may easily be overlooked.
Pipizella larvae confine their attention to subterranean aphids feeding on the roots of plants.
 Trichopsomyia apisaon (Walker, 1849)  The Black-haired Psyllid-killer
 Trichopsomyia recedens (Walker, 1852) The Shadowy Psyllid-killer

Subfamily MICRODONTINAE

Genus Microdon
The nine New York species is a fraction of the 126 worldwide species. The Microdon larvae live in the nests of ants as scavengers or predators and unlike other syrphid larvae, have no apparent body segmentation.
 Microdon abstrusus,Thompson, 1981 Hidden Ant Fly 
 Microdon abditus Thompson, 1981 Broad-footed Ant Fly
 Microdon cothurnatus Bigot, 1884  Orange-legged Ant Fly
 Microdon globosus Fabricius, 1805  Globular Ant Fly
 Microdon manitobensis Curran, 1924 Greater Ant Fly 
 Microdon megalogaster Snow, 1892 Black-bodied Ant Fly
 Microdon ocellaris|| Curran, 1924 .,Hairy-legged Ant Fly .
 Microdon ruficrus Williston, 1887 Spiny-shield Ant Fly 
 Microdon tristis Loew, 1864  Long-horned Ant Fly|

Genus Mixogaster
 Mixogaster breviventris (Kahl, 1897) The Slender Ant Fly is a rare species.

Subfamily SYRPHINAE
The larvae of Syrphinae are predators of aphids and other plant feeding insects. The role in controlling populations if these occasionally destructive "plant lice' is of interest to science as a possible bological control agents. The adult flies are small to medium sized, many with black and yellow patterning. Many species have elongate bodies. The four tribes of the Syrphidae are well represented in New York with the Syrphini being the most divers and numerous of the tribes while Toxomerini contains the most numerous and widespread species Toxomerus marginatus found across new york for much of the summer.

Tribe Bacchini

Genus Baccha 
Baccha (Fabricius, 1805)  has only one species in New York that is easily overlooked because of its small size.
 Baccha elongata (Cognata) (Fabricius, 1775) The Common Dainty Fly a common species.

Genus Melanostoma 
(Schiner, 1860)
 Melanostoma mellinum (Linnaeus, 1758) The Variable Duskyface is an abundant species.

Genus Platycheirus

A very large genus, perhaps 220 species worldwide and 23 species possibly in New york. In New York state Platycheirus is divided into seven morphological groups based on the shape and ornamentation of the front tarsi and tibia and other characteristics. press "show" below to see table. Species can be difficult to identify, especially females. A key, description, maps, photographs  has been published and contains keys to both male and female of the species where possible,

{|class="wikitable collapsible collapsed"
|+ Platycheirus morphological groups for males only
|-
! group!! width="300"|front leg!!other
|-
|Albimanus||Expanded probasitarsus, Tibia expanded over entire length ||
|-
|Ambiguus||Long curled seta at apex of profemur ||
|-
|Granditarsus|| Expanded probasitarsus in P. granditarsus unmodified on P. rosarium || Distinctive abdominal markings
|-
|Maniculatus||Expanded probasitarsus, ||
|-
|Peltatus|| Expanded probasitarsus, tibia expanded at apex ||
|-
|Pictipes||Unmodified proleg || 
|-
|Sengus||Long posterior black seta on pro- and meso-tibia || facial pollinosity arranged in oblique ripples or punctures
|-
|}

 Species:

Tribe Chrysotoxini

Genus Chrysotoxum
Chrysotoxum (Meigen, 1803)
 Chrysotoxum flavifrons, Macquart, 1842  The Blackshield Meadow Fly
 Chrysotoxum laterale, Loew, 1864 
 Chrysotoxum pubescens, Loew, 1864  The Yellow-throated Meadow Fly
 Chrysotoxum plumeum, Loew 1864, The Broad-banded Meadow Fly

Tribe Paragini

Genus Paragus
 Paragus angustifrons (Loew, 1863)  Narrow-faced Grass Skimmer
 Paragus tibialis (Fallén, 1817)
 Paragus haemorrhous (Meigen, 1822)  Black-backed Grass Skimmer
 Paragus angustistylus (Vockeroth, 1986) Thin-spined Grass Skimmer

Tribe Syrphini

Syrphini this tribe contains 15 genera and at least 38 species, though more are likely*, found in New York

Genus Allograpta
Allograpta (Osten Sacken, 1875), once recognized is found to be a common species across the state along with Toxomerus.
 Allograpta obliqua (Say, 1823) Say, T. 1823. Descriptions of dipterous insects of the United States. J. Acad. Nat. Sci. Philad. Oblique Streaktail

Genus Dasysyrphus 
Dasysyrphus (Enderlein, 1938) have recently been reviewed.
 Dasysyrphus laticaudus (Curran, 1925) Boreal Conifer Fly
 Dasysyrphus limatus (Hine, 1922) Narrow-banded Conifer
 Dasysyrphus venustus (Meigen), 1822  Transverse Conifer Fly
 Dasysyrphus intrudens (Osten Sacken, 1877) Confusing Conifer Fly

Genus Didea
Didea (Macquart, 1834) has a single species in New York.
 Didea fuscipes (Loew, 1863)  Undivided Lucent Fly

Genus Doros
 Doros aequalis (Loew, 1863)  Canadian Potter Fly

Genus Epistrophe
 Epistrophe grossulariae (Meigen, 1822)  Black-horned Smoothtail
 Epistrophe nitidicollis (Meigen, 1822)  Straight-banded Smoothtail 
 Epistrophe xanthostoma (Williston, 1887) Emarginate Smoothtail

Genus Epistrophella
Epistrophella emarginata (Say, 1823) Slender Smoothtail

Genus Eupeodes
 Eupeodes americanus (Wiedemann, 1830)  Long-tailed Aphideater
 Eupeodes latifasciatus (Macquart, 1829) Variable Aphideater
 Eupeodes perplexus (Osburn, 1910) Bare-winged Aphideater
 Eupeodes pomus (Curran, 1921) Short-tailed Aphideater
 Eupeodes volucris (Osten Sacken, 1877) bird hoverfly

Genus Lapposyrphus
 Lapposyrphus lapponicus (Zetterstedt, 1838) Common Loopwing Aphideater

Genus Leucozona
Leucozona (Schiner, 1860) with one distinct species in New York. Another species, Leucozona xylotoides, has been observed in states bordering the eastern border of New York.

Leucozona americana (Curran, 1923) American Whitebelt .

Genus Megasyrphus
 Megasyrphus laxus (Osten Sacken, 1875)  Black-legged Gossamer

Genus Melangyna
Melangyna (Verrall, 1901)
 Melangyna fisherii(Walton, 1911)  Large-spotted Halfband
 Melangyna lasiophthalma  (Zetterstedt, 1843) Hair-eyed Halfband
 Melangyna umbellatarum (Fabricius, 1794) Bare-winged Halfband

Genus Meligramma
The Meligramma (Frey, 1946) species in New York is also common in Europe
 Meligramma triangulifera (Zetterstedt, 1843) Variable Roundtail

Genus Meliscaeva
Meliscaeva (Frey, 1946) our one species is also common in Europe.
 Meliscaeva cinctella Common Thintail

Genus Ocyptamus
 Ocyptamus fuscipennis (Say, 1823)  Dusky-winged Hover Fly

Genus Parasyrphus
 Parasyrphus vockerothi Thompson 2012  Vockeroth's Bristleside

Genus Philhelius
 Philhelius flavipes (Loew, 1863)  American Harlequin Fly

Genus Sphaerophoria

New York species all with bright yellow and black abdominal markings the thorax is dark with yellow scutellum. yellow markings along the sides and hemispherical male terminalia
 Sphaerophoria asymmetrica (Knutson, 1973)  Asymmetric Globetail
 Sphaerophoria contigua (Macquart, 1847)  Tufted Globetail
 Sphaerophoria novaeangliae (Johnson, 1916)  Black-striped Globetail
 Sphaerophoria philanthus (Meigen, 1822)  Black-footed Globetail

Genus Syrphus
 Syrphus knabi The Eastern Flower Fly.
 Syrphus rectus The Yellow-legged Flower Fly.
 Syrphus torvus The Hairy-eyed Flower Fly
 Syrphus vitripennis The Black-legged Flower Fly.

Tribe Toxomerini

Genus Toxomerus
 Toxomerus marginatus (Say, 1823) Margined Calligrapher, the most common hoverfly in New York
 Toxomerus politus (Say, 1823) Maize Calligrapher
 Toxomerus geminatus (Say, 1823) Eastern Calligrapher

References

New York
Insects of the United States
Endemic fauna of New York (state)
Fauna of the Northeastern United States
Hoverflies of North America
Lists of Diptera by location